Oxyna nebulosa is a species of fruit fly in the family Tephritidae.

Distribution
United Kingdom & Finland France, Italy, Bulgaria & Ukraine, Israel.

References

Tephritinae
Insects described in 1817
Diptera of Europe